List of radio stations in Cagayan Valley.

Batanes

AM stations

No AM Station in Batanes

FM stations

Cagayan

AM stations

FM stations

Isabela

AM stations

FM stations

Nueva Vizcaya

AM stations

FM stations

Quirino

AM stations

No AM Station in Quirino

FM stations

References

Cagayan Valley
Radio stations